.ps is the Internet country code top-level domain ccTLD officially assigned to the State of Palestine.
It is administered by the Palestinian National Internet Naming Authority.

Registrations are processed by certified registrars.

The Internationalized country code top-level domain for the State of Palestine is .فلسطين, which is represented as .xn--ygbi2ammx in Punycode.

On 6 February 2013 the ISO 3166-1 code for the State of Palestine changed to reflect the PS used for the ccTLD.

Second level domains
Registrations can be made at the second-level as well as at several third-level domain names:

 .ps: open to anyone (not required to be Palestinian)
 com.ps, net.ps, org.ps: unrestricted
 edu.ps: Educational institutions.
 gov.ps: institutions of the PNA and government.
 sch.ps: Palestinian schools

Domain hacks

It has also been used in domain hacks, for example meetu.ps for meetups on the website Meetup, and by the University of Maryland as ter.ps.

References

External links
  nic.ps PNINA
  pnina.ps PNINA
 List of .ps registrars
 IANA .ps whois information
 CR for .PS

Country code top-level domains
Economy of the State of Palestine
Council of European National Top Level Domain Registries members
Mass media in the State of Palestine
Internet in the State of Palestine

he:סיומת אינטרנט#טבלת סיומות המדינות
sv:Toppdomän#P